Aquaculture is a peer-reviewed scientific journal covering research on aquaculture, published by Elsevier. It was established in 1972. The journal Annual Review of Fish Diseases, separately published from 1991 to 1996, was incorporated into Aquaculture following the cessation of its separate publication. Aquaculture is indexed by AGRICOLA, Animal Breeding Abstracts, Aquatic Sciences & Fisheries Abstracts, Biological Abstracts, BIOSIS Previews, CAB Abstracts, and Water Resources Abstracts.

References

External links
 

Aquaculture
Elsevier academic journals
Publications established in 1972
Agricultural journals
English-language journals
Weekly journals